The Memorial Route of Jewish Martyrdom and Struggle in Warsaw is located the Muranów district to commemorate people, events and places of the Warsaw Ghetto during the German occupation of Poland.

The memorial route begins at the Warsaw Ghetto Monument in the corner of ul. Zamenhofa and ul. Anielewicza and leads the visitor along a path of markers ending at the ul. Stawki near the Umschlagplatz Monument.

See also
 Warsaw Ghetto boundary markers

Warsaw Ghetto
Monuments and memorials in Warsaw
1988 sculptures
1988 establishments in Poland
Holocaust memorials in Poland